Ab Gel or Ab Gol or Abgel or Abgol may refer to:
 Abgol, Fars
 Ab Gel, Kerman
 Ab Gol, Kohgiluyeh and Boyer-Ahmad